Atanasio Pardo Vega (6 April 1900 – 30 July 1994) was a Chilean football manager and player who played as a left winger, considered the first Chilean footballer who emigrated to Europe holding a contract and played in Spain.

Playing career
As a youth players, Pardo and David Arellano, one of the founders of Colo-Colo, were members of Asociación Escolar, a team made up by select students. They also coincided after in Magallanes Atlético.

Pardo played for both Magallanes Atlético and Ibérico Balompié, later Unión Deportiva Española, before emigrating to Spain by suggestion of his fellow footballer Juan Legarreta. He joined Real Málaga in the Campeonato Regional Sur in 1925, playing for several seasons for the club, in an age where it was changing his name to Málaga FC, FC Malagueño and Málaga Sport Club. In Málaga, he also played for Victoria Football Club and Antequera CF.

Pardo also had stints with Saint-Denis in France and África Sport Club, a team that he called "The Spanish from Africa".
 
For a brief stint in 1926–27, he returned to Chile and played for Unión Deportiva Española. In the 1930s, he returned to Chile again as a retired player.

According to his sons, he returned permanently to Chile in 1941 after the Spanish Civil War, and played for Lautaro de Buin, among other clubs.

Coaching career
Back in Chile, Pardo joined Unión Deportiva Española as assistant of Andrés García. In 1938–39 he served as coach of Unión Española until the team retired from the Campeonato Nacional due to the Spanish Civil War, using the name Central in the match against Colo-Colo on 16 April 1939. In 1943, he assumed as head coach again and won the Primera División de Chile, the first league title for the team.
As a curiosity, Pardo was the oldest coach and led the youngest squad at the tournament. 

He also coached another clubs such as Antequera CF in Spain and both Lautaro de Buin and Tricolor de Paine in Chile, winning local championships, at the same time he performed as a player.

Personal life
His parents were Spanish who came first to Valparaíso, Chile, and next they made his home in Paine.

His twin brother, José, also was a footballer who played as a right winger, with whom Atanasio coincided in Unión Deportiva Española.

In Spain, he was nicknamed El Hombre-Relámpago (The Lightning Man) due to his speed as well as The Chilean (El Chileno).

Pardo married twice. From his first marriage, he had three children: Paty, Carlitos and Alicia. From his second marriage, he had nine children. His daughter Amalia played football for Unión Española and his son Arturo is the father-in-law of the Chile international goalkeeper Claudio Bravo.

He graduated as a obstetrician at the University of Málaga and helped labours in Viluco, Buin, where he made his home. He also served as President of the neighborhood association.

Honours

As player
Ibérico Balompíe
 Copa Unión-Asociación de Football de Santiago:

As manager
Unión Española
 Chilean Primera División (1): 1943

Legacy
Due to his contributions in Viluco, he is considered the driving force of Posta Viluco, the local medical center, where his daughter, María Luz, went go on helping of the community.

A street from Buin was given his name.

References

External links
 Atanasio Pardo at BDFutbol.com 

1900 births
1994 deaths
Chilean people of Spanish descent
Footballers from Santiago
Chilean footballers
Chilean expatriate footballers
Deportes Magallanes footballers
Magallanes footballers
Unión Española footballers
Málaga CF players
AD Ceuta footballers
AD Ceuta FC players
Antequera CF footballers
Lautaro de Buin footballers
Chilean expatriate sportspeople in Spain
Chilean expatriate sportspeople in France
Expatriate footballers in Spain
Expatriate footballers in France
Association football forwards
Chilean football managers
Chilean expatriate football managers
Unión Española managers
Chilean Primera División managers
Expatriate football managers in Spain
Twin sportspeople
Chilean twins
Sportspeople of Spanish descent